The Diocese of Aberdeen and Orkney is one of the seven dioceses of the Scottish Episcopal Church. Created in 1865, the diocese covers the historic county of Aberdeenshire, and the Orkney and Shetland island groups. It shares with the Roman Catholic Diocese of Aberdeen a Christian heritage that can be traced back to Norman times, and incorporates the ancient Diocese of Orkney, founded in 1035.

The diocese is considered the most conservative of the dioceses of the Scottish Episcopal Church, and was the only diocese to reject a change in the church's teaching to allow same-sex marriage in 2017.

The first female bishop of the SEC, Anne Dyer, was appointed to the diocese in November 2017 and consecrated and enthroned on 3 March 2018. Her gender, support of same-sex marriage, and the fact that she was not elected by the diocese itself (she was appointed by the College of Bishops in accordance with the SEC canonical process when a diocese fails to meet the requirements to elect its own bishop), caused some controversy, and two senior clergy, the Dean (Emsley Nimmo) and another member of the Cathedral Chapter, resigned their diocesan roles in protest. After further resignations by other clergy, the Westhill Community Church voted to leave the SEC in January 2019.

The diocese has a strong companion link with the Episcopal Diocese of Connecticut and the Episcopal Church in the United States of America. Samuel Seabury, the first Episcopal bishop outside the British Isles, was consecrated in 1784 by Robert Kilgour, Bishop of Aberdeen, and John Skinner, coadjutor bishop. Clarence Coleridge, suffragan bishop of Connecticut, was consecrated by a Bishop of Aberdeen in 1981; he was elected 13th diocesan bishop of Connecticut in 1993.

Area and population 
The diocese covers the historic counties of Orkney (population 21,500), Zetland (population 23,000), Aberdeenshire except the Huntly area (population 393,000), the Banff, Buckie and Cullen areas of Banffshire (population 29,500), and the Banchory and Lower Deeside areas of Kincardineshire (population 26,000).

List of bishops

List of provosts

List of deans
The following served as Dean of Aberdeen diocese:
bef. 18461850: John Cumming, of Longside
18501865: David Wilson, of Woodhead

The following have served as Dean of Aberdeen and Orkney:

 1865 to 1880: David Wilson (title changed)
 1880 to 1886: Arthur Ranken
 1886 to 1887: Alexander Harper 
 1887 to 1896: William Webster 
 1896 to 1906: William Walker 
 1907 to 1909: Myers Danson
 1910 to 1922: James Wiseman
 1922 to 1934: Robert Mackay
 1934 to 1948: George Bartlet
 1948 to 1953: John Wattie
 1953 to 1956: Frederick Easson, later bishop
 1956 to 1969: Richard Kerrin
 1969 to 1972: Ian Begg, later bishop
 1973 to 1978: Frederick Darwent, later bishop 
 1978 to 1983: Alexander Adamson
 1983 to 1988: Denis Bovey
 1988 to 2008: Gerald Stranraer-Mull 
 2008 to 2017: Emsley Nimmo
 2017 to 2020: vacant
 2020 to 2021: Dennis Berk
 2021–present Alison Simpson

Churches and clergy 
The diocese currently has 23 stipendiary clergy and 40 churches.

Former congregation

Closed churches in the diocese area

See also
Bishop of Aberdeen (before and after the Reformation)

References

Aberdeen and Orkney
Christianity in Aberdeen